Noussair El Maimouni (born February 20, 1991) is a Moroccan professional footballer who plays as a midfielder.

Club career

Moghreb Tétouan (2010–17)
Born in Tétouan, El Maimouni started his professional career in 2010 with local Moghreb Tétouan. He played with the club for seven years till 2017, amassing more than a hundred caps during his stint. While at the club, he won the league twice (2011–12 and 2013–14) and also played in the 2014 FIFA Club World Cup. In February 2016, he trialled with Spanish club Atlético Madrid and in the following month, reports emerged that he might join the club.

Ittihad Tanger (2017–18)
In 2017, he switched to Ittihad Tanger. But after being used sparingly, he returned to his former club in 2018 on a loan deal.

ATK (2018)
On 13 July 2018, El Maimouni moved abroad and joined the Indian Super League club ATK. He left the club at the end of the year.

Moghreb Tétouan (2019)
He went back to his former club, Moghreb Tétouan, in January 2019.

International career
El Maimouni has been capped by the under-23 team.

Statistics

Honours

Club
 Moghreb Tétouan
Botola (2): 2011–12, 2013–14
 Ittihad Tanger
Botola (1): 2017–18

References

External links

1991 births
Living people
Moroccan footballers
Moroccan expatriate footballers
Association football midfielders
Moghreb Tétouan players
Ittihad Tanger players
ATK (football club) players
MC Oujda players
Botola players
Indian Super League players
Morocco youth international footballers
People from Tétouan
Moroccan expatriate sportspeople in India
Expatriate footballers in India